Siim Roops (born 4 March 1986 in Tartu) is an Estonian footballer.

Career
He started his career in JK Tammeka Tartu. In 2007, he joined Valdres FK from FC Flora Tallinn. He later returned to Estonia and Flora Tallinn. He joined JK Viljandi Tulevik on loan, and later rejoined JK Tammeka. In 2012, he signed for FK Jerv in Norway.

He plays the position of defender and is 1.82 m tall.

International career
He made his national team debut for Estonia on 3 February 2007 against Poland, becoming 200th player to play for the country.

References

External links
 Player profile at JK Tammeka Tartu

1986 births
Living people
Sportspeople from Tartu
Estonian footballers
Tartu JK Tammeka players
FC Flora players
Viljandi JK Tulevik players
FK Jerv players
Estonia international footballers
Estonian expatriate footballers
Expatriate footballers in Norway
Estonian expatriate sportspeople in Norway
Association football defenders